Norma Bixby is a Democratic Party member of the Montana House of Representatives, representing District 41 since 2000.

External links
Montana House of Representatives - Norma Bixby official MT State Legislature website
Project Vote Smart - Representative Norma Bixby (MT) profile
Follow the Money - Norma Bixby
2006 2004 2002 2000 1998 Montana House campaign contributions

Members of the Montana House of Representatives
1941 births
Living people
Women state legislators in Montana
21st-century American women